Sisymbrium altissimum is a species of Sisymbrium. The plant is native to the western part of the Mediterranean Basin and is widely naturalized throughout most of the world, including all of North America. After maturity it forms a tumbleweed. Common names of the plant include Jim Hill mustard, tall tumblemustard, tall mustard, tumble mustard, tumbleweed mustard, tall sisymbrium, and tall hedge mustard.

Description
Its stem leaves are divided into thin, linear lobes, while the basal leaves are broader and pinnately compound. They have four usually yellow petals and four narrow, curved sepals. The seedpods are slender and long. The plant germinates in winter or early spring, with a lengthy blooming period. At maturity it dies, uproots, and tumbles in the wind, spreading its seeds.

Taxonomy 
The common name 'Jim Hill mustard' is after James J. Hill, a Canadian-American railroad magnate, due to a farmers' tall tale about the seeds having been spread via his railroads.

Distribution and habitat 
The plant is native to the western part of the Mediterranean Basin in Europe and Northern Africa and is widely naturalized throughout most of the world, including all of North America. It was probably introduced into North America as a seed contaminant of crops.

Ecology 
The plant grows in soils of all textures, even sand.

Uses 
The leaves are spicy enough to make wasabi but can also be mixed into salads and other dishes.

References

External links
FS.Fed.Us

altissimum
Flora of North Africa
Leaf vegetables
Plants described in 1753
Taxa named by Carl Linnaeus
Flora of Malta